Pavel Vladimirovich Dedunov (born April 8, 1990) is a Russian professional ice hockey forward who currently plays for Avangard Omsk of the Kontinental Hockey League (KHL).

Dedunov has previously played six seasons with Amur Khabarovsk through two separate tenures with the club. Following the 2018–19 season, Dedunov left as a free agent to sign a two-year contract with his third KHL club, Avangard Omsk, on 2 May 2019.

Awards and honours

References

External links

1990 births
Living people
People from Bolshoy Kamen
Amur Khabarovsk players
Avangard Omsk players
Severstal Cherepovets players
Russian ice hockey right wingers
Sportspeople from Primorsky Krai